Tagore Vidyaniketan Government Vocational Higher Secondary School, also known just as Tagore Vidyaniketan, is one of the most prominent Government schools in Kerala, India. It is situated in Raveendrapuram close to the Taliparamba town in the Kannur district in North Kerala.

History 
The idea to establish a 'residential school for the talented students from rural area' was first formulated in the centenary year of Rabindranath Tagore. It was first established as a privately run school in the name of Gurudeva Vidya Peetham in 1966.  It was handed over to the state government in 1974. From then on Tagore (as it is popularly known) has played a prominent role in ensuring quality education for the students from different districts of Kerala state.

Admission policies 
Tagore Vidyaniketan currently offers education for students from fifth standard to tenth standard. It also has a higher secondary section and vocational higher secondary section attached to it. The Vocational Higher Secondary section started in 1983-84. Students are selected based on an entrance examination to the fifth and eight standards. District collector of Kannur, DDE of Kannur, DEO of Kannur and the Principal are the members of the entrance examination committee. From fifth to seventh classes, each class has one division consisting generally of forty students. In eighth standard, thirty more students are admitted and hence classes from eight to tenth have two divisions each with thirty five students. Admission to the Higher Secondary and Vocational Higher Secondary Section is done through the common window system.

Academics 

From inception, Tagore Vidyaniketan had features and policies that set it apart from other government schools in Kerala. The school hours is from 9 am to 4 pm. The syllabus followed is that prescribed by the state's department of education and the medium of instruction is Malayalam.   The most significant differences Tagore has from other government run schools in Kerala are 
Admissions based on entrance examinations.
Additional working hours including Saturday forenoon, 9 AM to 10 AM every morning and 1.30 PM to 2 PM every afternoon.
A session of newspaper reading during 9 AM to 10 AM for upper primary students and 1.30 PM to 2 PM for high school students.
Monthly tests conducted for modules taught every month.
Preparatory examinations during January to March, for students appearing in the Secondary School Leaving Certificate Examination.
Boarding facilities for students, which was later abandoned.

Achievements 

Tagore Vidyaniketan's remarkable academic achievements are evident from the fact that, it has achieved 100% results in the Secondary School exit Certificate exam in all the years of its existence. Tagore has been winning the Ever-rolling Mathai trophy for the best government-run school in the state of Kerala, ever since its inception.

The students of the school have also excelled in non curricular activities like Kerala state youth festival, Samskrithotsavam  and state fairs for science, mathematics and work experience. Also Tagore Vidayniketan's Boy Scout unit won six Rashtrapati awards in 2005) and  three Rajyapuraskar awards in 2009.

References

High schools and secondary schools in Kerala
Schools in Kannur district
Taliparamba
Educational institutions established in 1966
1966 establishments in Kerala